The 1981 Belgian International Championships was a men's tennis tournament staged at the Leopold Club in Brussels, Belgium that was part of the Grand Prix circuit. The tournament was played on outdoor clay courts and was held from 8 June until 14 June 1981. It was the tenth and last edition of the tournament and third-seeded Marko Ostoja won the singles title.

Finals

Singles
 Marko Ostoja defeated  Ricardo Ycaza 4–6, 6–4, 7–5
 It was Ostoja's only singles title of his career.

Doubles
 Ricardo Cano /  Andrés Gómez defeated  Carlos Kirmayr /  Cássio Motta 6–2, 6–2

References

Belgian International Championships
Belgian International Championships
Belgian International Championships, 1981